The Enabling Act of 1802 was passed on April 30, 1802, by the Seventh Congress of the United States. This act authorized the residents of the eastern portion of the Northwest Territory to form the state of Ohio and join the U.S. on an equal footing with the other states. In doing so it also established the precedent and procedures for creation of future states in the western territories.

Ohio was the first state to be created out of the Northwest Territories, as established by the Northwest Ordinance in 1787 in an act of the Continental Congress under the Articles of Confederation.  The Northwest Ordinance laid out the conditions for the creation of a state from a territory. By the Census of 1800, the easternmost part of the Northwest Territories had reached a population of 45,365 and it was believed it would reach the required 60,000 by 1803, when statehood would be achieved. The Enabling Act of 1802 set forth the legal mechanisms and authorized the people of Ohio to begin this process.

Elections of delegates were held in the various counties of the Eastern District of the Northwest Territory in 1802, and the delegates met from November 1 to November 29, 1802 to choose a name for the state and draft a state constitution.

List of delegates

Those who ratified the constitution November 29, 1802:

 Edward Tiffin, President and delegate of Ross County
 Adams County
 Joseph Darlinton  Israel Donalson  Thomas Kirker
 Belmont County
 James Caldwell  Elijah Woods
 Clermont County
 Philip Gatch  James Sargent
 Fairfield County
 Henry Abrams  Emanuel Carpenter
 Hamilton County
 John W. Browne  Charles Willing Byrd  Francis Dunlavy  William Goforth
 John Kitchel  Jeremiah Morrow  John Paul  John Reily
 John Smith  John Wilson
 Jefferson County
 Rudolph Bair  George Humphrey  John Milligan  Nathan Updegraff
 Bezaleel Wells
 Ross County
 Michael Baldwin  James Grubb  Nathaniel Massie  Thomas Worthington
 Trumbull County
 David Abbot  Samuel Huntington
 Washington County
 Ephraim Cutler  Benjamin Ives Gilman  John McIntire  Rufus Putnam

Note
 Wayne County was left out of participating by the Congress.  This was because it was populated by Federalists who would oppose statehood, while the apportionment was by the opposing party, according to one author.

References

Further reading
 - biographies of the above participants.

 
Constitution convention Delgates
Ohio Constitution Convention
Ohio Constitution Convention
Ohio Convention
Constitution Convention 1802
Constitutional Convention 1802